High and Dizzy is a 1920 American short comedy film starring Harold Lloyd.

Plot
The film revolves around a young woman who sleepwalks and the doctor who is attempting to treat her. The climactic scene involves the young woman sleepwalking precariously on the outside ledge of a tall building, anticipating Lloyd's more famous skyscraper-scaling scenes in Safety Last! (1923). A subplot has Lloyd and his friend getting inebriated on homemade liquor and then trying to avoid a prohibition-era policeman who pursues them for being drunk.

Cast
 Harold Lloyd as The Boy
 Mildred Davis as The Girl 
 Roy Brooks as His Friend
 Wallace Howe as Her Father
 William Gillespie (uncredited)
 Mark Jones as Hotel Bellboy Number 2 (uncredited)
 Gaylord Lloyd (uncredited)
 Charles Stevenson as Police Officer (uncredited)
 Noah Young as Man who breaks hotel room door (uncredited)

See also
 Harold Lloyd filmography

External links

Progressive Silent Film List: High and Dizzy at silentera.com

1920 films
1920 comedy films
American silent short films
American black-and-white films
Films directed by Hal Roach
Silent American comedy films
Films with screenplays by H. M. Walker
Articles containing video clips
1920 short films
American comedy short films
Surviving American silent films
1920s American films